Leonessa is also the name of a frazione of Bassano Romano.
Leonessa is a town and comune in the far northeastern part of the Province of Rieti in the Lazio region of central Italy. Its population in 2008 was around 2,700.

Situated in a small plain at the foot of Mt. Terminillo, one of the highest mountains of the Apennine range, in the winter Leonessa is known mostly as a low-key staging center for the ski slopes of the Terminillo, and in the summer as a weekend vacation town frequented for the most part by Romans with local roots.

Historically, the town is known mostly as the birthplace of St. Giuseppe di Leonessa. Until 1927 it was part of the province of L'Aquila. The town suffered one of the worst German reprisals during World War II when the Wehrmacht and the SS killed 51 inhabitants in early April 1944. A monument dedicated to the dead was erected in 1959.
Typical food production include the local variety of potato, known as patata di Leonessa.

Leonessa is twinned with the French town of Gonesse.

Main sights
Leonessa is an art city of primarily medieval aspect, with a historical main square. Churches include:
San Pietro
San Francesco
Church and sanctuary of San Giuseppe
Santa Maria del Popolo
Madonna di Loreto

Frazioni
Albaneto, Casanova, Fontenova, Leonessa Colleverde, Cumulata, Sala, San Clemente, San Vito, Vallimpuni, Viesci, Vindoli, Volciano, Casale dei Frati, Villa Alesse, Villa Berti, Villa Bigioni, Villa Bradde, Villa Carmine, Villa Ciavatta, Villa Climinti, Villa Colapietro, Villa Cordisco, Villa Gizzi, Villa Lucci, Villa Massi, Villa Pulcini, Villa Zunna, Albaneto, Piedelpoggio, Villa Immagine, Corvatello, Sant'Angelo, Terzone, Casa Buccioli, Capodacqua, Ocre, Pianezza, San Giovenale, Vallunga

External links

Bill Thayer's site

Cities and towns in Lazio